Eriodu railway station (Code: EDU) is a railway station situated in Eriodu, Dindigul district in the Indian state of Tamil Nadu. The station is an intermediate station on the newly commissioned Salem Junction–Karur Junction line which became operational in  May 2013. The station is operated by the Southern Railway zone of the Indian Railways and comes under the Salem railway division.

References

Salem railway division
Railway stations in Dindigul district